Heiskell is an unincorporated community in Knox and Anderson counties, Tennessee, United States. It is the location of a post office, assigned ZIP code 37754.

Waste Management's Chestnut Ridge Landfill, which serves the metropolitan Knoxville region, is located in Heiskell near Interstate 75.

Notes

Unincorporated communities in Anderson County, Tennessee
Unincorporated communities in Knox County, Tennessee
Unincorporated communities in Tennessee